Sylvain Richard (born 17 February 1979), better known by his stage name 20syl (pronounced "vain-seel"), is a French rapper, disc jockey and producer. He is a composer and MC in the group Hocus Pocus, member of beatmaker collective of DJs C2C, one half of the Hip Hop/Electronic duo AllttA and quadruple world champion DMC Team. He published his first EP, Motifs, in 2014, followed by Motifs II in 2015.

During his career, he also produced for artists and groups such as Diam's, Disiz, Kohndo, Slum Village, Fabe, Scred Connexion, Nakk, Sully Sefil, and is involved in projects such as Just Us vol.1 or Original Bombattak.

Biography 
Richard, originally a graphic designer, graduated from the Graduate School of Fine Arts in Nantes Métropole. He began his musical career in his bedroom at his parents' house in Rezé.

In 1995, Richard and Cambia released their first mixtape, Première Formule. Recorded in a makeshift studio, the first self-produced cassette was sold in the courtyard of their school. In 1997, they associated with DJ Greem, a high school friend of Richard's, to form the group Hocus Pocus, and released their first album as a trio, Seconde Formule, in 1998. Hocus Pocus mixes elements specific to hip-hop (scratches, samples, rap) to an instrumental sound influenced by jazz, soul and funk. Alongside Hocus Pocus, they created in collaboration with DJ Atom and DJ Pfel, a group called C2C (also known as "Coups2Cross"). C2C was the world champion DMC team four years in a row from 2003 to 2006. They found the collaboration of two MCs and a DJ did not work on stage and went their separate ways; Richard continued his production as 20syl and DJ Greem invested specifically in C2C.

In 2001, Richard worked again with DJ Greem and Cambia on stage as Hocus Pocus. The same year, they created the label On & On and released the maxi Sick, which sold around 4000 copies. Three years later, they released the album 73 Touches (in reference to the number of piano keys). Largely influenced by jazz, they refer to Miles Davis and Billie Holiday. Mathieu Lelièvre on keyboard, Hervé Godard on bass and David Le Deunff on guitar complement the trio. The same album was reissued in 2006 with a new version of Sick and six new titles.

The album Place 54, released in October 2007, increased their willingness to create acoustic hip-hop. For this album, they signed with the label Motown France to promote and distribute it. The album was well received and attracted interest from mainstream TV and radio. In 2008, Hocus Pocus was nominated for a Victoires de la Musique award in the category "Urban Music Album of the Year".

Richard published his first solo EP, Motifs, on the 9 June 2014; the site sourdoreille.net considers this EP as "a real gem" whilst wordplaymagazine.com praises Richard's style as "frankly remarkable". His second EP, Motifs II, was published on 11 May 2015. Regarding the cover of Motifs II Richard explains: "For the first volume, I played on the contrast between the zebra and the checkerboard. For this one, I wanted another animal. I like animals with a solemn air, which release an aesthetic force. When I came across this owl, I found him mysterious and chic. I also chose the motif of the opposition in the checkered plumage. It is a way to symbolize the two aspects of my music: electronic and organic. This refined and enigmatic image raises questions."

In July 2015 in Nantes, Richard presented the U, an interactive musical skateboard ramp (in collaboration with the collective Herrmutt Lobby). herrmuttlobby.com says regarding U "The skater is the musician and the ramp is the instrument. He composes and decomposes the rhythm, he breaks down initial binary arrangements, making the digital human again for a moment." In September 2015 The Apple Keynote used a piece of Richard's music to promote the functionality of Siri on the Apple Watch in their "Choose Colorfully" advertisement. In late 2015, Richard published a remix of the PLPS song How I Feel. In January 2016, he published his first year production entitled Inertia. Also in January 2016, he published a remix of the song Walk Walk by Yael Naim.

In 2015 he formed the group AllttA (A Little Lower Than The Angels) with the Californian rapper Mr. J. Medeiros. Their debut album, titled The Upper Hand, was released on February 17, 2017. Their sophomore album, titled Facing Giants, was released on December 1, 2017.

Discography

Singles 

 2014 : Ongoing Thing (feat. Oddisee)
 2021 : Bagarre

EPs 
 2014 : Motifs
 2015 : Motifs II

Album(s) 

 2020 : 36 (Beats & Types)

Remix album 
 1999 : 20Syl's Remix Tape

Collaborations and remixes 
 2002 : 20syl – On and On (track 13 on the mixtape 1son2rue by Cut Killer)
 2006 : Sixième Sens – Herbes de Provinces (feat. 20syl, Prince d'arabee, Orelsan, Gringe)
 2007 : Amelie (Mr. J. Medeiros feat. 20syl)
 2012 : Pale Blue Dot (Mr. J. Medeiros feat. Shad (20syl Remix))
 2012 : Le sucre pimenté (Remix) (Oxmo Puccino feat. Orelsan, Greg Frite, Busta Flex, Grodash, Youssoupha, Dabaaz, 3010 & 20syl)
 2013 : Kraked Unit – Chinese Puzzle (20syl Remix)
 2013 : Rihanna – Stay (20syl You Can't Be Serious Remix)
 2013 : Gush – Sieblings (20syl Remix)
 2013 : Moongaï – Cosmofamille (20syl Remix)
 2013 : Game, Set & Match
 2013 : Electro Deluxe – Devil (20syl Remix)
 2013 : Blitz the Ambassador – Respect Mine (feat. 20syl, Emicida, Y'akoto)
 2013 : Elodie Rama – City of Hope (20syl Version)
 2013 : Dtwice – Devil's Tune (20syl Remix)
 2013 : Misteur Valaire – Don't Get Là (20syl Remix)
 2013 : Room Bang (Grems feat. 20syl)
 2013 : My Heart (Letters to the Sun feat. 20syl)
 2014 : Gregory Porter – Liquid Spirit (20syl Remix)
 2014 : 20syl & Kafutchino – Kouign Amann (La Fine Equipe album La Boulangerie, Vol. 3 – La Fine Equipe & Friends)
 2014 : Ed Sheeran – Thinking Out Loud (20syl Remix)
 2014 : Shuko – The Same (feat. CL Smooth & 20syl)
 2014 : Yelle – Complètement fou (20syl Remix)
 2014 : Game Set & Match II (created for the 2014 BNP Paribas Masters international tennis tournament)
 2014 : V052 V1M (Jakarta Records album Summer In Jakarta)
 2014 : Coin Banks – Thomas Lawrence (feat. 20syl, Tab-One, Anders & The Ruby Horns)
 2014 : Pigeon John – Boomerang (feat. 20Syl)
 2014 : Bet Dap Goom Bown (BoomBap Festival Beat)
 2014 : The Drops – Atalante (20syl Remix)
 2014 : Obsession (Fixpen Sill & 20syl)
 2014 : Schoolboy Q – The Purge / Rapfix Cypher (20syl Remix)
 2014 : Kyla La Grange – Cut Your Teeth (20syl Remix)
 2014 : 10YRS (Hip OPsession 10th Anniversary Track)
 2014 : Seinabo Sey – Younger (20syl Remix)
 2014 : King Krule – Easy Easy (20syl Remix)
 2014 : Kendrick Lamar – Sing that Shit (20syl Juicy Remix)
 2015 : Moar & Sarsha Simone – Gonna Do Me (20syl Remix)
 2015 : Ibrahim Maalouf – Red and Black Light (20syl Remix)
 2015 : PLPS – How I Feel (20syl Remix)
 2016 : Yaël Naim – Walk Walk (20syl Remix)
 2016 : ODESZA – It's Only (feat. Zyra) (20syl Remix)
 2016 : The Geek x Vrv – I Don't Wanna Know (feat. Mirror Signal) (20syl Remix)
 2016 : Everydayz, Phazz – Almeria (20syl Remix)
 2016 : 20syl – Inertia (charity compilation AMAL)
 2018 : AllttA – Bucket (20syl Remix)
 2018 : Electro Deluxe – Keep my Baby Dancing (20syl Remix)
 2018 : Inüit – Tomboy (20syl Remix)
 2019 : La Fine Équipe, Grems & 20syl – Nobu
 2019 : Electric guest – Dollar (20syl Remix)
2020 : AllttA – Ampersand
2020 : Thaïs Lona – Best Part (Daniel Cesar cover) (20syl Remix)
2021 : Brent Faiyaz – Circles (20syl Remix)
2022 : La Chica – Agua (20syl Remix)
2022 : Too Many T's & 20syl – Roots
2022 : Beyoncé – Break my Soul (20syl Remix)
2022 : Thaïs Lona – B.N.D (20syl Remix)

Collaborative albums 
 1996 : Première Formule (mixtape, with Hocus Pocus)
 1998 : Seconde Formule (self-produced album, with Hocus Pocus)
 2001 : Flyin' Saucer (with C2C)
 2002 : Flyin' Saucer II (with C2C)
 2002 : Acoustic HipHop Quintet (maxi, with Hocus Pocus)
 2002 : Conscient (maxi, with Hocus Pocus)
 2002 : On and On Part II (maxi, with Hocus Pocus)
 2003 : Flyin' Saucer III (with C2C)
 2005 : 73 Touches (with Hocus Pocus)
 2007 : Place 54 (with Hocus Pocus)
 2010 : 16 pièces (with Hocus Pocus)
 2012 : Down the Road (EP, with C2C)
 2012 : Tetra (LP, with C2C)
 2016 : Touch Down, Pt. I (EP, with AllttA)
 2016 : The Woods (EP, with AllttA)
 2016 : AllttA (EP with Mr. J. Medeiros)
 2017 : The Upper Hand (LP, with AllttA)
 2017 : Facing Giants (LP, with AllttA)

References

http://earmilk.com/2016/03/24/saga-blu-and-20syl-get-up-without-the-happy-pills-premiere/
http://djbooth.net/artists/20syl
http://www.tsugi.fr/magazines/2016/06/29/20syl-j-medeiros-hip-hop-allttarnatif-17896 

1979 births
Living people